Wanderer is the eighth album by German extreme metal band Heaven Shall Burn, released on 16 September 2016 through Century Media Records. The album was released with 12 tracks; a deluxe version was also released with a cover of Sodom's song "Agent Orange" as a bonus track, plus a bonus disc which is a compilation of covers that the band recorded since its inception and also included in previous releases.

The tracks "Bring the War Home" and "Downshifter" were released as promotional singles, including a lyric video for "Bring the War Home."

Track listing

Personnel 
 Heaven Shall Burn
 Marcus Bischoff – vocals
 Alexander Dietz – guitars, production, engineer
 Maik Weichert – guitars, co-production
 Eric Bischoff – bass
 Christian Bass – drums

Additional musicians
 René Liedtke - lead guitars, additional vocals
 George Corpsegrinder Fisher - vocals (track 6)
 Aðalbjörn Tryggvason - vocals (track 13)
 Nick Hipa - guitar (track 9)
 Frank Blackfire - guitar (track 7)

Charts

References 

Heaven Shall Burn albums
2016 albums
Century Media Records albums